Popcat is an Internet meme originating in 2020. The original video featuring the cat, named 'Oatmeal', chirping at a bug is posted on Twitter by its owner XavierBFB. This was later developed into an online clicker game, Popcat.click, by Joshua O'Sullivan, Edward Hails and Freddy Heppell, three Computer Science students at the University of Sheffield. Originally started as a joke, in April 2021 it became popular in Finland aggregating over 3 billion "pops" while in August 2021 it became a trend in Taiwan following the success of Chinese Taipei at the 2020 Summer Olympics and generated significant media coverage in Thailand where it was used during anti-government protests. The website consists of a meme photograph of the cat which opens its mouth when tapped on. Similar clone and parody websites with other memes also attracted billions of clicks. A leaderboard shows the top countries and the number of "pops per second" for each country. As of 21 August 2021, Hong Kong, Taiwan, Japan and Thailand had each clicked in excess of 100 billion times. In an interview with BBC Thai, the developers of the game also credited its popularity to the large number of people in lockdown due to the COVID-19 pandemic.

Google Trends released its annual Year in Search results, including what video games were chart-toppers in 2021 and POPCAT was listed as the No.1 top trending game for 2021.

References

External links 
 Official site - popcat.click

Incremental games
Internet culture